Marc Seliger (born 1 May 1974) is a German ice hockey player. He competed in the men's tournament at the 2002 Winter Olympics.

References

External links
 

1974 births
Living people
Olympic ice hockey players of Germany
Ice hockey players at the 2002 Winter Olympics
People from Iserlohn
Sportspeople from Arnsberg (region)
Washington Capitals draft picks
Starbulls Rosenheim players
Portland Pirates players
Hampton Roads Admirals players